Mark R. Woodward is an American academic and author of Islam in Java.

He conducted ethnographic research in the Yogyakarta Indonesia region in the New Order era.

Critical response
Islam in Java elicited a range of responses due to its diverging from Clifford Geertz's observations of almost 30 years before in East Java.

References

Publications
 Woodward, Mark R. (1989)  Islam in Java : normative piety and mysticism in the sultanate of Yogyakarta  University of Arizona Press, Tucson: Monographs of the Association for Asian Studies ; no. 45.   (alk. paper)
 Suwarno, Peter (1999) Dictionary of Javanese proverbs and idiomatic expressions with a foreword by Mark R. Woodward Yogyakarta, Indonesia : Gadjah Mada University Press. 
 Lukens-Bull, Ronald and Mark Woodward (2011)  “Goliath and David in Gaza: Indonesian myth-building and conflict as a cultural system.” Contemporary Islam: Dynamics of Muslim Life 5:1-17

External links
Arizona State University Webpage for Woodard

Year of birth missing (living people)
Living people
American anthropologists